In mathematics, a topological space  is said to be limit point compact or weakly countably compact if every infinite subset of  has a limit point in  This property  generalizes a property of compact spaces.  In a metric space, limit point compactness, compactness, and sequential compactness are all equivalent.  For general topological spaces, however, these three notions of compactness are not equivalent.

Properties and examples

 In a topological space, subsets without limit point are exactly those that are closed and discrete in the subspace topology.  So a space is limit point compact if and only if all its closed discrete subsets are finite.
 A space  is  limit point compact if and only if it has an infinite closed discrete subspace.
 Every countably compact space (and hence every compact space) is limit point compact.
 For T1 spaces, limit point compactness is equivalent to countable compactness.
 An example of limit point compact space that is not countably compact is obtained by "doubling the integers", namely, taking the product  where  is the set of all integers with the discrete topology and  has the indiscrete topology.  The space  is homeomorphic to the odd-even topology.  This space is not T0.  It is limit point compact because every nonempty subset has a limit point.
 An example of T0 space that is limit point compact and not countably compact is  the set of all real numbers, with the right order topology, i.e., the topology generated by all intervals   The space is limit point compact because given any point  every  is a limit point of 
 For metrizable spaces, compactness, countable compactness, limit point compactness, and sequential compactness are all equivalent.
 Closed subspaces of a limit point compact space are limit point compact.
 The continuous image of a limit point compact space need not be limit point compact.  For example, if  with  discrete and  indiscrete as in the example above, the map  given by projection onto the first coordinate is continuous, but  is not limit point compact.
 A limit point compact space need not be pseudocompact.  An example is given by the same  with  indiscrete two-point space and the map  whose image is not bounded in 
 A pseudocompact space need not be limit point compact.  An example is given by an uncountable set with the cocountable topology.
 Every normal pseudocompact space is limit point compact.Proof: Suppose  is a normal space that is not limit point compact.  There exists a countably infinite closed discrete subset  of   By the Tietze extension theorem the continuous function  on  defined by  can be extended to an (unbounded) real-valued continuous function on all of   So  is not pseudocompact.
 Limit point compact spaces have countable extent.

See also

Notes

References

  
  
 

Properties of topological spaces
Compactness (mathematics)